Glenbuck railway station served the village of Glenbuck in Ayrshire, Scotland.

Opening

The station opened sometime before October 1875 as from that time it appeared in Bradshaw's timetables.

Location
The station had a single platform to the north of the single track railway, two goods sidings to the west and one to the east all north of the running line.

The siding to the east had been removed and one of the western ones extended by 1908.

To the east of the station the line went over a causeway skirting the edge of Glenbuck Loch.

Closure
The station closed on 4 August 1952. The line remained open for passengers and freight until 5 October 1964, when it closed, a casualty of the programme of closures advocated by the Beeching Report.

References

Citations

Bibliography

External links

Disused railway stations in East Ayrshire
Railway stations in Great Britain opened in 1875
Railway stations in Great Britain closed in 1952
Beeching closures in Scotland
Former Caledonian Railway stations